Aššur (Sumerian:  AN.ŠAR2KI, Assyrian cuneiform:  Aš-šurKI, "City of God Aššur";  Āšūr; Old Persian  Aθur, : Āšūr; ,), also known as Ashur and Qal'at Sherqat, was the capital of the Old Assyrian city-state (2025–1364 BC), the Middle Assyrian Empire (1363–912 BC), and for a time, of the Neo-Assyrian Empire (911–609 BC). The remains of the city lie on the western bank of the Tigris River, north of the confluence with its tributary, the Little Zab, in what is now Iraq, more precisely in the al-Shirqat District of the Saladin Governorate.

Occupation of the city itself continued for approximately 4,000 years, from the Early Dynastic Period to the mid-14th century AD, when the forces of Timur massacred its predominately Christian population. The site is a World Heritage Site, having been added to that organisation's list of sites in danger in 2003 following the conflict that erupted following the US-led 2003 invasion of Iraq and as a result of a proposed dam which would flood some of the site.

History of research
Exploration of the site of Assur began in 1898 by German archaeologists. Excavations began in 1900 by Friedrich Delitzsch, and were continued in 1903–1913 by a team from the Deutsche Orient-Gesellschaft led initially by Robert Koldewey and later by Walter Andrae. More than 16,000 clay tablets with cuneiform texts were discovered. The German archeologists brought objects they found to Berlin enhancing the collection of the Pergamon Museum.

More recently, Ashur was excavated by B. Hrouda for the Ludwig Maximilian University of Munich and the Bavarian Ministry of Culture in 1990. During the same period, in 1988 and 1989, the site was being worked by R. Dittmann on behalf of the Deutsche Forschungsgemeinschaft.

Name

 is the name of the city, of the land ruled by the city, and of its tutelary deity from which the natives took their name, as did the entire nation of Assyria which encompassed what is today northern Iraq, north east Syria and south east Turkey. Today the Assyrians are still found throughout the Middle East, particularly in Iraq, Iran, Syria, Turkey, and the Diaspora in the western world. Assur is also the origin of the names Syria and terms for Syriac Christians, these being originally Indo-European derivations of Assyria, and for many centuries applying only to Assyria and the Assyrians (see Etymology of Syria) before also being applied to the Levant and its inhabitants by the Seleucid Empire in the 3rd century BC.

History

Early Bronze Age
According to the Oxford Companion to the Bible, Assur was "built on a sandstone cliff on the west bank of the Tigris about 35 km (24 mi) north of its confluence with the lower Zab River". Archaeology reveals the site of the city was occupied by the middle of the 3rd millennium BC. This was still the Sumerian period, before Assyria emerged. The oldest remains of the city were discovered in the foundations of the Ishtar temple, as well as at the Old Palace. In the subsequent period, the city was ruled by kings from the Akkadian Empire. During the Third Dynasty of Ur, the city was ruled by Assyrian governors subject to the Sumerians.

Old and Middle Assyrian Periods

By the time the Neo-Sumerian Ur-III dynasty collapsed at the hands of the Elamites around the end of the 21st century BC according to the Middle Chronology and mid-20th century according to the Short Chronology following increasing raids by Gutians and Amorites. The native Akkadian-speaking Assyrian kings were now free while Sumer fell under the yoke of the Amorites. The historically unverified king Ushpia is credited with dedicating the first temple of the god Ashur in his home city, although this comes from a later inscription from Shalmaneser I in the 13th century. In around 2000 BC, Puzur-Ashur I founded a new dynasty, with his successors such as Ilushuma, Erishum I and Sargon I leaving inscriptions regarding the building of temples to Ashur, Adad and Ishtar in the city. Prosperity and independence produced the first significant fortifications in this period. As the region enjoyed relative peace and stability, trade between Mesopotamia and Anatolia increased, and the city of Ashur greatly benefited from its strategic location. Merchants would dispatch their merchandise via caravan into Anatolia and trade primarily at Assyrian colonies in Anatolia, the primary one being at Karum Kanesh (Kültepe).

With Shamshi-Adad I's (1813–1781 BC) capital at Assur, he magnified the city's power and influence beyond the Tigris river valley, establishing what some regard as the first Assyrian Empire. In this era, the Great Royal Palace was built, and the temple of Assur was expanded and enlarged with a ziggurat. However, this empire met its end when Hammurabi, the Amorite king of Babylon conquered and incorporated the city into his short lived empire following the death of Ishme-Dagan I around 1756 BC, while the next three Assyrian kings were viewed as vassals. Not long after, the native king Adasi expelled the Babylonians and Amorites from Assur and Assyria as a whole around 1720 BC, although little is known of his successors. Evidence of further building activity is known from a few centuries later, during the reign of a native king Puzur-Ashur III, when the city was refortified and the southern districts incorporated into the main city defenses. Temples to the moon god Sin (Nanna) and the sun god Shamash were built and dedicated through the 15th century BC. The city was subsequently subjugated by the king of Mitanni, Shaushtatar in the late 15th century, taking the gold and silver doors of the temple to his capital, Washukanni, as spoils.

Ashur-uballit I emulated his ancestor Adasi and overthrew the Mitanni empire in 1365 BC. The Assyrians reaped the benefits of this triumph by taking control of the eastern portion of the Mitanni Empire, and later also annexing Hittite, Babylonian, Amorite and Hurrian territory. The following centuries witnessed the restoration of the old temples and palaces of Assur, and the city once more became the throne of a magnanimous empire from 1365 BC to 1076 BC. Tukulti-Ninurta I (1244–1208 BC) also constructed a new temple to the goddess Ishtar. The Anu-Adad temple was established later during the reign of Tiglath-Pileser I (1115–1075 BC).

Neo-Assyrian Empire

In the Neo-Assyrian Empire (912–605 BC), the royal residence was transferred to other Assyrian cities. Ashur-nasir-pal II (884–859 BC) moved the capital from Assur to Kalhu (Calah/Nimrud) following a series of successful campaigns and produced some of the greatest artworks in the form of colossal lamassu statues and low-relief depictions of the royal court as well as battles. With the reign of Sargon II (722–705 BC), a new capital began to rise: Dur-Sharrukin (Fortress of Sargon). Dur-Sharrukin was originally planned to be built on a scale set to surpass that of Ashurnasirpal's. However, he died in battle and his son and successor Sennacherib (705–682 BC) abandoned the city, choosing to magnify Nineveh as his royal capital. However, the city of Ashur remained the religious center of the empire and continued to be revered as the holy crown of the empire, due to its temple of the national god Ashur. In the reign of Sennacherib (705–682 BC), the House of the New Year, Akitu, was built, and the festivities celebrated in the city. Many of the kings were also buried beneath the Old Palace while some queens were buried in the other capitals such as the wife of Sargon, Ataliya. The city was sacked and largely destroyed during the decisive battle of Assur, a major confrontation between the Assyrian and Median armies.

Achaemenid Empire
After the Medes were overthrown by the Persians as the dominant force in ancient Iran, Assyria was ruled by the Persian Achaemenid Empire (as Athura) from 549 BC to 330 BC (see Achaemenid Assyria). The Assyrians of Mada (Media) and Athura (Assyria) had been responsible for gold and glazing works of the palace and for providing Lebanese cedar timber, respectively. The city and region of Ashur had once more gained a degree of militaristic and economic strength. Along with the Assyrians in Mada, a revolt took place in 520 BC but ultimately failed. Assyria seems to have recovered dramatically, and flourished during this period. It became a major agricultural and administrative centre of the Achaemenid Empire, and its soldiers were a mainstay of the Persian Army.

Parthian Empire

The city revived during the Parthian Empire period, particularly between 150 BC and 270 AD, being resettled and becoming an administrative centre of Parthian-ruled Assuristan. Assyriologists Simo Parpola and Patricia Crone suggest Assur may have had outright independence in this period. New administrative buildings were erected to the north of the old city, and a palace to the south. The old temple dedicated to the national god of the Assyrians Assur (Ashur) was rebuilt, as were temples to other Assyrian gods.

Assyrian Eastern Aramaic inscriptions from the remains of Ashur have yielded insight into the Parthian-era city with Assyria having its own Aramaic Syriac script, which was the same in terms of grammar and syntax as that found at Edessa and elsewhere in the state of Osroene.

German semiticist Klaus Beyer (1929-2014) published over 600 inscriptions from Mesopotamian towns and cities including Ashur, Dura-Europos, Hatra, Gaddala, Tikrit and Tur Abdin. Given that Christianity had begun to spread amongst the Assyrians throughout the Parthian era, the original Assyrian culture and religion persisted for some time, as proven by the inscriptions that include invocations to the gods Ashur, Nergal, Nanna, Ishtar and Shamash, as well as mentions of citizens having compound names that refer to Assyrian gods, such as ʾAssur-ḥēl (Ashur [is] my strength), ʾAssur-emar (Ashur decreed/commanded), ʾAssur-ntan (Ashur gave [a son]), and ʾAssur-šma' (Ashur has heard; cf. Esarhaddon).

The Roman historian Festus wrote in about 370 that in AD 116 Trajan formed from his conquests east of the Euphrates the new Roman provinces of Mesopotamia and Assyria. The existence of the latter Roman province is questioned by C.S. Lightfoot and F. Miller. In any case, just two years after the province's supposed creation, Trajan's successor Hadrian restored Trajan's eastern conquests to the Parthians, preferring to live with him in peace and friendship.
 
There were later Roman incursions into Mesopotamia under Lucius Verus and under Septimius Severus, who set up the Roman provinces of Mesopotamia and Osroene.

Assur was captured and sacked by Ardashir I of the Sasanian Empire  240 AD, whereafter the city was destroyed and its population was dispersed.

Threats to Assur
The site was put on UNESCO's List of World Heritage in danger in 2003, at which time the site was threatened by a looming large-scale dam project that would have submerged the ancient archaeological site.  The dam project was put on hold shortly after the 2003 invasion of Iraq.

The territory around the ancient site was occupied by the Islamic State of Iraq and the Levant (ISIL) in 2015. Since ISIL had destroyed a number of ancient historical sites, including the cities of Hatra, Khorsabad, and Nimrud, fears rose that Assur would be destroyed too. According to some sources, the citadel of Assur was destroyed or badly damaged in May 2015 by members of IS using improvised explosive devices. An AP report from December 2016 after the Iraqi forces had retaken the area, said that the militants tried to destroy the city's grand entrance arches, but they remained standing and a local historian described the damage as "minor".

As of February 2017, the group no longer controls the site; however, it is not secure enough for archaeological experts to evaluate.

See also
 Ashur (god) and Ashurism
 Chronology of the ancient Near East
 Cities of the ancient Near East
 Kings of Assyria
 Short chronology timeline
 World Heritage Sites in Danger
 Assyrian homeland

Notes

References
 
 Walter Andrae: Babylon. Die versunkene Weltstadt und ihr Ausgräber Robert Koldewey. de Gruyter, Berlin 1952.
 Stefan Heidemann: Al-'Aqr, das islamische Assur. Ein Beitrag zur historischen Topographie Nordmesopotamiens. In: Karin Bartl and Stefan hauser et al. (eds.): Berliner Beiträge zum Vorderen Orient. Seminar fur Altorientalische Philologie und Seminar für Vorderasiatische Altertumskunde der Freien Universität Berlin, Fachbereich Altertumswissenschaften. Dietrich Reimer Verlag, Berlin 1996, pp. 259–285
 Eva Cancik-Kirschbaum: Die Assyrer. Geschichte, Gesellschaft, Kultur. C.H.Beck Wissen, München 2003. 
 Olaf Matthes: Zur Vorgeschichte der Ausgrabungen in Assur 1898-1903/05. MDOG Berlin 129, 1997, 9-27. ISSN 0342-118X
 Peter A. Miglus: Das Wohngebiet von Assur, Stratigraphie und Architektur. Berlin 1996. 
 Susan L. Marchand: Down from Olympus. Archaeology and Philhellenism in Germany 1750-1970. Princeton University Press, Princeton 1996. 
 Conrad Preusser: Die Paläste in Assur. Gebr. Mann, Berlin 1955, 1996. 
 Friedhelm Pedde, The Assur-Project. An old excavation newly analyzed, in: J.M. Córdoba et al. (Ed.), Proceedings of the 5th International Congress on the Archaeology of the Ancient Near East, Madrid, April 3–8, 2006. Universidad Autónoma de Madrid Ediciones, Madrid 2008, Vol. II, 743-752.https://www.jstor.org/stable/41147573
 Steven Lundström, From six to seven Royal Tombs. The documentation of the Deutsche Orient-Gesellschaft excavation at Assur (1903-1914) – Possibilities and limits of its reexamination, in: J.M. Córdoba et al. (Ed.), Proceedings of the 5th International Congress on the Archaeology of the Ancient Near East, Madrid, April 3–8, 2006. Universidad Autónoma de Madrid Ediciones, Madrid 2008, Vol. II, 445-463.
 Friedhelm Pedde, The Assur-Project: A new Analysis of the Middle- and Neo-Assyrian Graves and Tombs, in: P. Matthiae – F. Pinnock – L. Nigro – N. Marchetti (Ed.), Proceedings of the 6th International Congress on the Archaeology of the Ancient Near East, May, 5th-10th 2008, "Sapienza" – Università di Roma. Harrassowitz, Wiesbaden 2010, Vol. 1, 913–923.
 Barbara Feller, Seal Images and Social Status: Sealings on Middle Assyrian Tablets from Ashur, in: P. Matthiae – F. Pinnock – L. Nigro – N. Marchetti (Ed.), Proceedings of the 6th International Congress on the Archaeology of the Ancient Near East, May, 5th-10th 2008, "Sapienza" – Università di Roma. Harrassowitz, Wiesbaden 2010, Vol. 1, 721-729.
 Friedhelm Pedde, The Assur Project: The Middle and Neo-Assyrian Graves and Tombs, in: R. Matthews – J. Curtis (Ed.), Proceedings of the 7th International Congress on the Archaeology of the Ancient Near East, London 2010. Harrassowitz, Wiesbaden 2012, Vol. 1, 93-108.
 Friedhelm Pedde, The Assyrian heartland, in: D.T. Potts (Ed.), A Companion to the Archaeology of the Ancient Near East. Wiley-Blackwell, Chichester 2012, Vol. II, 851-866.

External links 

 
 Assyrian origins: discoveries at Ashur on the Tigris: antiquities in the Vorderasiatisches Museum, Berlin, an exhibition catalog from The Metropolitan Museum of Art Libraries (fully available online as PDF), which contains material on Assur
 Friedhelm Pedde, Recovering Assur. From the German Excavations of 1903–1914 to today's Assur Project in Berlin 

25th-century BC establishments
Populated places established in the 3rd millennium BC
Populated places disestablished in the 14th century
1898 archaeological discoveries
Amorite cities
Ancient Assyrian cities
Archaeological sites in Iraq
Buildings and structures destroyed by ISIL
Saladin Governorate
World Heritage Sites in Danger
World Heritage Sites in Iraq
Old Assyrian Empire
Early Period (Assyria)
Former kingdoms